The Ci Lake is a lake in Jinning Township, Kinmen County, Taiwan.

History
The lake was created in 1969 for military strategic purpose by constructing a levee.

Geology
The lake spans over an area of 120 hectares and is primarily used for fish farming.

See also
 Geography of Taiwan

References

1969 establishments in Taiwan
Jinning Township
Lakes of Kinmen County